Simon William Walton (born 13 September 1987) is an English footballer who plays as a midfielder for Havant & Waterlooville. He has played in the Football League for Leeds United, Ipswich Town, Cardiff City, Queens Park Rangers, Hull City, Plymouth Argyle, Blackpool, Crewe Alexandra, Stevenage, and Crawley Town. Walton was capped by England at under-16, under-17 and under-19 level.

Career

Leeds United
Born in Sherburn-in-Elmet, Walton started his career at hometown club Leeds United. He came to attention after being sent off in a pre-season friendly against Valencia in 2004, whilst still just sixteen. He was likened to former Elland Road heroes Alan Smith and David Batty. He made his competitive debut on 7 August 2004 against Derby County, and went on to score three goals in the 2004–05 season, Leeds' first in the Championship. Walton struggled to break into the first team during the 2005–06 season with his only appearances coming after injuries to Sean Gregan, Shaun Derry, Jonathan Douglas and Gylfi Einarsson.

Charlton Athletic
In July 2006 he joined Premier League side Charlton Athletic for an initial fee of £500,000, with clauses that could create a total £1m fee. He quickly moved on loan to get some regular first-team football, moving to Ipswich Town three games into the Championship season on 18 August 2006. Walton scored several important goals for Ipswich before being loaned to another Championship side, Cardiff City, in January 2007. When playing for Cardiff, he was sent off against former club Leeds for two bookable offences.

Queens Park Rangers
Walton joined Championship side Queens Park Rangers on 27 July 2007 in a £200,000 deal, having never played a competitive game for Charlton. Shortly afterwards, he broke his leg in a friendly against Fulham.

On 29 January 2008 Walton moved to Championship play-off hopefuls Hull City on loan for the remainder of the 2007–08 season.

Plymouth Argyle
On 6 August 2008, Walton signed for Plymouth Argyle on a four-year contract. Originally proclaimed as a club record signing at £750,000, the initial fee paid was well below the £500,000 paid to Cardiff City for Steve MacLean and never surpassed it prior to the club being placed in administration in March 2011. Walton made his debut for Plymouth in a 2–2 draw with Wolves on 9 August.

On 22 December 2008 Walton was placed on the transfer list by Paul Sturrock after being sent off in a league match against Barnsley. Sturrock questioned Walton's attitude and temperament after some abject performances, and rash decisions by the player. On 26 March 2009 he joined Blackpool on loan until the end of the season. He made his debut on 11 April as a 74th-minute substitute in Blackpool's 1–0 West Lancashire Derby win over Preston North End at Deepdale.

On 31 August 2009 he joined Crewe Alexandra on loan for the 2009–10 season.

Walton joined Sheffield United on a season-long loan in July 2010. However, he suffered cruciate knee ligament damage during his first outing for the club in a pre-season friendly which proved to be a long-term injury. Following a recovery period at Bramall Lane his parent club, Plymouth Argyle, agreed to terminate his loan and recall him at the start of September.
On 5 April 2011, Walton made his first appearance for nine months, and his first for Argyle since 2008, against Leyton Orient. Walton scored his first goal in the match against MK Dons on 25 April 2011.
After the club appointed Carl Fletcher as caretaker manager the captaincy was handed to Walton who has become one of the senior players in the young squad. Walton has subsequently scored several goals, some as penalties, including a brace against Burton Albion on 14 January 2012.

Walton had his contract extended until the end of the 2012–13 season in April 2012. Manager Carl Fletcher revealed that Walton had agreed a new deal the previous autumn when the club was in the process of being bought by businessman James Brent. "He signed a new deal during the takeover to benefit the club," said Fletcher in an interview with BBC Radio Devon. "He agreed terms on a deal when the club was being taken over to help and aid the club in getting it out of administration."

Hartlepool United
Walton was released by Plymouth in July 2012 so he could be closer to his daughter, and signed for Hartlepool United on 6 July.

Stevenage
Walton signed for Stevenage on 30 June 2014 on a free transfer.

Crawley Town
Walton signed for Crawley Town on 18 June 2015 on a free transfer on a two-year deal.

Maidstone United
On 12 October 2018, Walton joined Maidstone United permanently after a short-term loan. At the end of December 2018, Tristan Lewis was appointed caretaker manager, with Walton as his assistant.

Havant & Waterlooville
On 11 May 2019, Havant & Waterlooville announced that Walton had joined the club as a player / coach.

Personal life
Walton began dating Nicola Tappenden, a glamour model, in 2007 and they went on to be engaged. He became a father in November 2008 when Tappenden gave birth to a baby girl named Poppy. His younger sister, Sophie, represented England at youth international level, and has played in the Women's Premier League and Women's Super League. Both Simon and Sophie studied at Boston Spa Academy during their time as Leeds United Academy scholars.

Career statistics

References

External links

1987 births
Living people
English footballers
England youth international footballers
Association football midfielders
Leeds United F.C. players
Charlton Athletic F.C. players
Ipswich Town F.C. players
Cardiff City F.C. players
Queens Park Rangers F.C. players
Hull City A.F.C. players
Plymouth Argyle F.C. players
Blackpool F.C. players
Crewe Alexandra F.C. players
Sheffield United F.C. players
Hartlepool United F.C. players
Stevenage F.C. players
Crawley Town F.C. players
Garforth Town A.F.C. players
Guiseley A.F.C. players
Sutton United F.C. players
Billericay Town F.C. players
Maidstone United F.C. players
Havant & Waterlooville F.C. players
English Football League players
National League (English football) players
People from Sherburn in Elmet
People educated at Boston Spa Academy